Below the Salt is the fourth studio album by Steeleye Span and their first after they joined the Chrysalis label. The album takes medieval influence and combines it with the band's British folk rock style. The lineup on the album includes Bob Johnson and Rick Kemp making their debuts in the band. By this point, Ashley Hutchings had left the band, leaving Tim Hart and Maddy Prior as the only remaining founding members.

The album was recorded in May and June 1972 at Sound Techniques studios in Chelsea, London. Tracks were mainly chosen by Hart and Prior, but it was Johnson who suggested the band add their Christmas hit "Gaudete". They self-produced the album because they could not yet find a replacement after Sandy Roberton departed.

"Gaudete" became the band's first hit, reaching number 14 on the UK charts. To give the impression of the choristers approaching and then moving away, the song was given a long fade-in and -out on the album. The single release, however, featured no fade.

The album reached number 43 in the UK album charts.

Track listing
All songs on the album are Traditional, adapted by Steeleye Span
"Spotted Cow"
"Rosebud in June"
"Jigs: The Bride's Favourite/Tansey's Fancy"
"Sheep-crook and Black Dog"
"Royal Forester"
"King Henry"
"Gaudete"
"John Barleycorn"
"Saucy Sailor"

Personnel
Steeleye Span
Maddy Prior - vocals
Tim Hart - vocals, Appalachian dulcimer, guitar
Peter Knight - violin, viola, mandolin, banjo, piano, vocals
Rick Kemp - bass, drums, vocals
Bob Johnson - guitar, vocals

References

1972 albums
Chrysalis Records albums
Steeleye Span albums